The 2022 Diriyah ePrix was a pair of Formula E electric car races held at the Riyadh Street Circuit in the town of Diriyah, north-west of Riyadh, in Saudi Arabia on 28 and 29 January 2022. It was the opening round of the 2021–22 Formula E season and the fourth edition of the Diriyah ePrix, and was held at night for the second time. Novelties for the event included the introduction of a knockout-style qualifying format, which replaced the series' long-standing four-group and superpole qualifying.

The first race was won by defending world champion Nyck de Vries, with Stoffel Vandoorne and Jake Dennis rounding out the podium. Edoardo Mortara won the second race, ahead of Robin Frijns and Lucas di Grassi.

Background
Nyck de Vries entered the event as the series' reigning world champion, whilst his team Mercedes-EQ Formula E Team are the defending constructors' champions in what is set to be their last season in Formula E.

Regulation changes
The races were the first to see the new knockout-style qualifying format introduced for the season. Under the new format, the grid is split into two groups of eleven cars, each of which will have ten minutes to set the fastest time with the cars set to deliver 220kW of power. The fastest four drivers from each group then advance to a knockout-style  tournament to decide the top eight, with the drivers being eliminated via quarter-final and semi-final heats to leave a two-car battle for pole position. The cars' usable power is upped to 250kW for the knockout stages.

Driver changes
Following the withdrawal of Audi from Formula E at the end of the 2020–21 season, former champion Lucas di Grassi moved to ROKiT Venturi, partnering the incumbent Edoardo Mortara and replacing Norman Nato, the series' latest race winner, who moved to Jaguar as a reserve driver. Long-time Nissan e.dams driver Oliver Rowland switched to Mahindra Racing to replace the outgoing Alex Lynn, his space at Nissan being taken by former Andretti driver and three-time race winner Maximilian Günther.

Three drivers made their Formula E debuts at the event. Former Formula One driver Antonio Giovinazzi joined Dragon / Penske Autosport to partner Brazilian Sérgio Sette Câmara. Former Red Bull junior Dan Ticktum joined NIO to replace the outgoing Tom Blomqvist alongside Oliver Turvey. 2019 Indy Lights champion and former IndyCar driver Oliver Askew joined Andretti Autosport, no longer factory-backed by BMW, to partner Jake Dennis, who came third in the 2020–21 season as a rookie.

Classification

Race one

Qualifying

Qualifying duels

Overall classification 

Notes:
  – Oliver Rowland received a 3-place grid penalty for impeding another driver in the pit lane.

Race

Notes:
  – Pole position.
  – Fastest lap.

Race two

Qualifying

Qualifying duels

Overall classification 

Notes:
  – Oliver Rowland received a 3-place grid penalty for causing a collision in race one.
  – António Félix da Costa had his quarter-final duel lap time deleted for missing his slot.
  – Sérgio Sette Câmara had all his qualifying lap times cancelled for impeding another driver.
  – Nick Cassidy did not take part in qualifying as his team could not repair his car in time following an accident in free practice. He was allowed to start the race from the back of the grid.

Race

Notes:
  – Fastest lap.
  – Pole position.
  – Mitch Evans received a post-race drive-through penalty converted into a 24-second time penalty for failing to activate the second of the two mandatory attack modes.

Notes

References

|- style="text-align:center"
|width="35%"|Previous race:2021 Berlin ePrix
|width="30%"|FIA Formula E World Championship2021–22 season
|width="35%"|Next race:2022 Mexico City ePrix
|- style="text-align:center"
|width="35%"|Previous race:2021 Diriyah ePrix
|width="30%"|Diriyah ePrix
|width="35%"|Next race:2023 Diriyah ePrix
|- style="text-align:center"

2022
2021–22 Formula E season
2022 in Saudi Arabian sport
January 2022 sports events in Saudi Arabia